In operator theory, a branch of mathematics, a positive-definite kernel is a generalization of a positive-definite function or a positive-definite matrix. It was first introduced by James Mercer in the early 20th century, in the context of solving integral operator equations. Since then, positive-definite functions and their various analogues and generalizations have arisen in diverse parts of mathematics. They occur naturally in Fourier analysis, probability theory, operator theory, complex function-theory, moment problems, integral equations, boundary-value problems for partial differential equations, machine learning, embedding problem, information theory, and other areas.

Definition 

Let  be a nonempty set, sometimes referred to as the index set. A symmetric function  is called a positive-definite (p.d.) kernel on  if

holds for any , given . 

In probability theory, a distinction is sometimes made between positive-definite kernels, for which equality in (1.1) implies , and positive semi-definite (p.s.d.) kernels, which do not impose this condition. Note that this is equivalent to requiring that any finite matrix constructed by pairwise evaluation, has either entirely positive (p.d.) or nonnegative (p.s.d.) eigenvalues.

In mathematical literature, kernels are usually complex valued functions, but in this article we assume real-valued functions, which is the common practice in applications of p.d. kernels.

Some general properties  
 For a family of p.d. kernels 
 The conical sum   is p.d., given 
 The product  is p.d., given 
 The limit  is p.d. if the limit exists.
 Let .

Examples of p.d. kernels 

 Common examples of p.d. kernels defined on Euclidean space  include:
 Linear kernel: .
 Polynomial kernel: .
 Gaussian kernel (RBF kernel): .
 Laplacian kernel: .
 Abel kernel: .
 Kernel generating Sobolev spaces : , where  is the Bessel function of the third kind.
 Kernel generating Paley–Wiener space: .
 If  is a Hilbert space, then its corresponding inner product  is a p.d. kernel. Indeed, we have 
Most observations are usually available under the form of nonnegative vectors of counts, which, if normalized, yield histograms of frequencies. It has been shown  that the following family of squared metrics, respectively Jensen divergence, the -square, Total Variation, and two variations of the Hellinger distance:can be used to define p.d. kernels using the following formula

History 

Positive-definite kernels, as defined in (1.1), appeared first in 1909 in a paper on integral equations by James Mercer. Several other authors made use of this concept in the following two decades, but none of them explicitly used kernels , i.e. p.d. functions (indeed M. Mathias and S. Bochner seem not to have been aware of the study of p.d. kernels). Mercer’s work arose from Hilbert’s paper of 1904  on Fredholm integral equations of the second kind:

In particular, Hilbert had shown that

where  is a continuous real symmetric kernel,  is continuous,  is a complete system of orthonormal eigenfunctions, and ’s are the corresponding eigenvalues of (1.2). Hilbert defined a “definite” kernel as one for which the double integral 
 
The original object of Mercer’s paper was to characterize the kernels which are definite in the sense of Hilbert, but Mercer soon found that the class of such functions was too restrictive to characterize in terms of determinants. Mercer then proved that for any continuous p.d. kernel the expansion

holds absolutely and uniformly.

E.H. Moore  initiated the study of a very general kind of p.d. kernel. If  is an abstract set, he calls functions  defined on  “positive Hermitian matrices” if they satisfy (1.1) for all . Moore was interested in generalization of integral equations and showed that to each  such  there is a Hilbert space  of functions such that, for each . This property is called the reproducing property of the kernel and turns out to have importance in the solution of boundary-value problems for elliptic partial differential equations.

Another line of development in which p.d. kernels played a large role was the theory of harmonics on homogeneous spaces as begun by E. Cartan in 1929, and continued by H. Weyl and S. Ito. The most comprehensive theory of p.d. kernels in homogeneous spaces is that of M. Krein which includes as special cases the work on p.d. functions and irreducible unitary representations of locally compact groups.

In probability theory, p.d. kernels arise as covariance kernels of stochastic processes.

Connection with reproducing kernel Hilbert spaces and feature maps 

Positive-definite kernels provide a framework that encompasses some basic Hilbert space constructions. In the following we present a tight relationship between positive-definite kernels and two mathematical objects, namely reproducing Hilbert spaces and feature maps.

We first define a reproducing kernel Hilbert space (RKHS):

Definition: Space  is called a reproducing kernel Hilbert space if the evaluation functionals are continuous. 

Every RKHS has a special function associated to it, namely the reproducing kernel:

Definition: Reproducing kernel is a function  such that
 , and
The latter property is called the reproducing property. 

The following result shows equivalence between RKHS and reproducing kernels:

Now the connection between positive definite kernels and RKHS is given by the following theorem

As stated earlier, positive definite kernels can be constructed from inner products. This fact can be used to connect p.d. kernels with another interesting object that arises in machine learning applications, namely the feature map. Let  be a Hilbert space, and  the corresponding inner product. Any map  is called a feature map. In this case we call  the feature space. It is easy to see  that every feature map defines a unique p.d. kernel by

Indeed, positive definiteness of  follows from the p.d. property of the inner product. On the other hand, every p.d. kernel, and its corresponding RKHS, have many associated feature maps. Then , by the reproducing property.
Moreover, through the equivalence of p.d. kernels and its corresponding RKHS, every feature map can be used to construct a RKHS.

Kernels and distances 

Kernel methods are often compared to distance based methods such as nearest neighbors. In this section we discuss parallels between their two respective ingredients, namely kernels  and distances .

 , and  if and only if ,
 ,
 .

One link between distances and p.d. kernels is given by a particular kind of kernel, called a negative definite kernel, and defined as follows

Definition: A symmetric function  is called a negative definite (n.d.) kernel on  if

holds for any  and  such that .
At the same time each distance does not correspond necessarily to a n.d. kernel. This is only true for Hilbertian distances, where distance  is called Hilbertian if one can embed the metric space  isometrically into some Hilbert space.

On the other hand, n.d. kernels can be identified with a subfamily of p.d. kernels known as infinitely divisible kernels. A nonnegative-valued kernel  is said to be infinitely divisible if for every  there exists a positive-definite kernel  such that .

Given a positive-definite kernel , we can define a distance function as:

Some applications

Kernels in machine learning 

Positive-definite kernels, through their equivalence with reproducing kernel Hilbert spaces, are particularly important in the field of statistical learning theory because of the celebrated representer theorem which states that every minimizer function in an RKHS can be written as a linear combination of the kernel function evaluated at the training points. This is a practically useful result as it effectively simplifies the empirical risk minimization problem from an infinite dimensional to a finite dimensional optimization problem.

Kernels in probabilistic models 
There are several different ways in which kernels arise in probability theory.

 Nondeterministic recovery problems: Assume that we want to find the response  of an unknown model function  at a new point  of a set , provided that we have a sample of input-response pairs  given by observation or experiment. The goal is to get information about the function  which replaces  in the deterministic setting. This is described by a covariance kernel . Such a kernel exists and is positive-definite under weak additional assumptions. Now a good estimate for  can be obtained by using kernel interpolation with the covariance kernel, ignoring the probabilistic background completely.

 Density estimation by kernels: The problem is to recover the density  of a multivariate distribution over a domain , from a large sample  including repetitions. Where sampling points lie dense, the true density function must take large values. A simple density estimate is possible by counting the number of samples in each cell of a grid, and plotting the resulting histogram, which yields a piecewise constant density estimate. A better estimate can be obtained by using a nonnegative translation invariant kernel , with total integral equal to one, and define  as a smooth estimate.

Numerical solution of partial differential equations 

One of the greatest application areas of so-called meshfree methods is in the numerical solution of PDEs. Some of the popular meshfree methods are closely related to positive-definite kernels (such as meshless local Petrov Galerkin (MLPG), Reproducing kernel particle method (RKPM) and smoothed-particle hydrodynamics (SPH)). These methods use radial basis kernel for collocation.

Stinespring dilation theorem

Other applications 
In the literature on computer experiments  and other engineering experiments, one increasingly encounters models based on p.d. kernels, RBFs or kriging. One such topic is response surface methodology. Other types of applications that boil down to data fitting are rapid prototyping and computer graphics. Here one often uses implicit surface models to approximate or interpolate point cloud data.

Applications of p.d. kernels in various other branches of mathematics are in multivariate integration, multivariate optimization, and in numerical analysis and scientific computing, where one studies fast, accurate and adaptive algorithms ideally implemented in high-performance computing environments.

See also 
Covariance function
Integral equation
Integral transform
Positive-definite function on a group
Reproducing kernel Hilbert space
Kernel method

References 

Operator theory
Hilbert space